Fyodorovka is a rural locality (a selo) in Ikryaninsky District, Astrakhan Oblast, Russia. The population was 682 as of 2010. There are 12 streets.

Geography 
Fyodorovka is located 34 km south of Ikryanoye (the district's administrative centre) by road. Ninovka is the nearest rural locality.

References 

Rural localities in Ikryaninsky District